The results of the Fourth Periodical Review of the Boundary Commission for Scotland became effective, as a result of Order in Council SI 1995 No 1037 (S.90), for the 1997 general election of the House of Commons of the Parliament of the United Kingdom (Westminster).

The review defined 28 burgh constituencies (BCs) and 44 county constituencies (CCs), with each electing one Member of Parliament (MP) by the first past the post system of election. Therefore, Scotland had 72 parliamentary seats.

The new constituencies were defined in reference to the boundaries of local government regions and districts and islands areas effective on 1 June 1994, and each constituency was entirely within a region or a grouping of two or entirely within an islands area or a grouping of two. However, under the Local Government etc (Scotland) Act 1994, the regions and districts were abolished in favour of new council areas in 1996, the year before the new constituencies were first used in an election.

1997 boundaries were used also in the 2001 general election.

The results of the Fifth Periodical Review, defining new constituencies in reference to the new council areas, became effective for the 2005 general election.

Regions

Islands areas

Notes and references 

Historic parliamentary constituencies in Scotland (Westminster)
1997 in Scotland
1997 in British politics